Kavala Prefecture was one of the prefectures of Greece. Its capital was Kavala. It was established in 1915, soon after its territory was incorporated into Greece in the Balkan Wars. The prefecture was disbanded on 1 January 2011 by the Kallikratis programme, and split into the regional units of Kavala and Thasos.

Prefectures of Greece
Geography of Eastern Macedonia and Thrace
History of Kavala
Thasos
1915 establishments in Greece
States and territories established in 1915
2010 disestablishments in Greece
States and territories disestablished in 2010